Kahlil Seren (born October 17, 1978) is an American politician, former local government advisor, and the first directly elected Mayor of Cleveland Heights, Ohio. Before becoming Mayor, Seren served for ten years as a Policy Advisor for Cuyahoga County Council and six years as a Cleveland Heights City Council member.

Seren took office as Cleveland Heights’ first directly elected, strong Mayor on January 1, 2022.

Early life and education 
Seren was born in Cleveland Heights, Ohio but spent his childhood in East Cleveland, Ohio. He attended several elementary schools, including the Lillian Ratner Montessori Day School (Lyndhurst, OH), Gilmour Academy (Gates Mills, OH), Prospect Elementary School (East Cleveland, OH), and FOCAS/SCOPE Elementary (East Cleveland, OH). Seren relocated to Beachwood, Ohio, in 1991, attending Beachwood Middle School and Beachwood High School, where he graduated in 1997.

After high school, Seren studied at Eastern Michigan University (Ypsilanti, MI) before transferring to Cleveland State University (Cleveland, OH), where he earned a Bachelor of Arts degree in Psychology and Political Science. After completing his undergraduate degree, Seren continued at Cleveland State University’s Maxine Goodman Levin College of Urban Affairs, earning a Master of Science degree in Urban Studies.

Career 
Seren began his career in the area of public policy in 2007 as the Communications Coordinator for Policy Matters Ohio, a non-profit policy research institute. After a massive public corruption scandal in Cuyahoga County government and subsequent restructuring of County Government, Seren entered public service in 2011 as a Policy Advisor to the newly established Cuyahoga County Council, the legislative authority of the county government. Seren primarily advised on matters related to economic development, community development, workforce development, and education, serving as a Policy Advisor to County Council until 2022.

Cleveland Heights City Council 
Seren entered elective office in February 2015, appointed to an unexpired term on Cleveland Heights City Council, filling a vacancy when former Council member Janine Boyd won a seat in the Ohio House of Representatives. Seren ran to keep the seat in November 2015, winning his first four-year term. In November 2019, Seren successfully sought reelection to Cleveland Heights City Council, winning a second term beginning January 2020, at which time the Council selected him to be Vice Mayor and Vice President of Council.

Mayor of Cleveland Heights

Election 
On January 25, 2021, Seren announced his candidacy in the City of Cleveland Heights’ first mayoral election, which was to be held later that year. Seren was one of three candidates on the September 14, 2021, mayoral primary ballot, finishing second with 38% of the vote and advancing as one of two candidates in the general election. On November 2, 2021, Seren won the general election for Mayor of Cleveland Heights with more than 60% of the vote.

Tenure

2022 
Seren took office as Cleveland Heights’ first directly elected, strong Mayor on January 1, 2022.

References

External links 

 Mayor's Office | Cleveland Heights, OH

Mayors of places in Ohio
Living people
21st-century African-American politicians
21st-century American politicians
African-American people in Ohio politics
Cleveland State University alumni
Ohio Democrats
African-American mayors in Ohio
1978 births